Gunnar Breimo (born 23 May 1939 in Alstahaug) is a Norwegian politician for the Labour Party.

He was elected to the Norwegian Parliament from Nordland in 1993, and was re-elected on one occasion.

Breimo was a member of Alstahaug municipality council from 1979 to 1993 and again in the period 2003–2007, serving as mayor from 1983 to 1993.

References

1939 births
Living people
Labour Party (Norway) politicians
Members of the Storting
20th-century Norwegian politicians
People from Alstahaug
Place of birth missing (living people)